The  is an electric multiple unit (EMU) train type operated in Japan by the private railway operator Hankyu Railway since 1995.

Formations
, the fleet consists of two two-car sets, formed as follows.

The "Mc1" cars are fitted with two single-arm pantographs.

These trains are only used during the AM rush hours between 7am and 8:30am, and only on Commuter Limited Express and Rapid Express trains, when cumulative congestion can reach 147% during this time.

Interior
Seating accommodation includes tip-up seats to increase passenger capacity.

References

Electric multiple units of Japan
8200 series
Train-related introductions in 1995
Alna Koki rolling stock
1500 V DC multiple units of Japan